Aizawl Monorail is the proposed monorail for the town of Aizawl, capital of the state of Mizoram in North-East India.
The decision for the monorail is being taken because of increase in number of vehicles in town, which causes traffic problems.

Network

There is only one line of length 5 km running from north to the south of Aizawl.
 Corridor (5 km):- Zemabawk - Kulikawn

Project detail
Government of Mizoram has asked, Rail India Technical & Economic Services Limited (RITES), to prepare a technical as well as economic feasibility report of this mono rail system in Aizawl. The monorail project will be executed under Build, Own, Operate and Transfer (BOOT) basis.

The system was proposed in 2011 but as of 2022 it is not clear if the project will proceed.

References

Proposed monorails in India
Transport in Mizoram
Rail transport in Mizoram
Transport in Aizawl